Samuel Wensley Blackall (1 May 1809 – 2 January 1871) was an Irish soldier and politician, who was the second Governor of Queensland from 1868 until he died in office in 1871.

Early life
Blackall was born in Dublin, Ireland into a prosperous Irish family and attended Trinity College, Dublin at the age of 15, but did not graduate. In 1827 he joined the 85th (Bucks Volunteers) Regiment of Foot, as an ensign and was appointed a lieutenant in 1832. He sold his commission in 1833 after five years service and joined the Royal Longford Militia, as a major.

Public life
He entered Irish public life in 1833, becoming High Sheriff of Longford for 1833 and, several years later, high sheriff of County Tyrone for 1862. In between those appointments, he spent four years as an MP in the British House of Commons for the constituency of Longford.

From 1851 to 1857, he worked in the colonial service as Lieutenant-Governor of Dominica. After some trouble with the Colonial Office, he returned to colonial service as governor of Sierra Leone, then governor in chief at the West African Settlements from 1865, and then Governor of Queensland from 1868. Blackall's tenure as governor was dominated by a constitutional crisis caused by a deadlock in the Legislative Assembly of Queensland.

Death and legacy
By 1870, Blackall's health was declining rapidly, and shortly after selecting the highest burial site at the new Toowong Cemetery, he died in office on 2 January 1871.

The town of Blackall in Queensland was named after him, as was the Blackall Range and Blackall Terrace in East Brisbane and the merchant ship SS Governor Blackall.

References

External links

 
Blackall, Samuel Wensley — Brisbane City Council Grave Location Search
 

1809 births
1871 deaths
Military personnel from Dublin (city)
UK MPs 1847–1852
Governors of Queensland
Royal Irish Fusiliers officers
British Militia officers
Members of the Parliament of the United Kingdom for County Longford constituencies (1801–1922)
Burials at Toowong Cemetery
High Sheriffs of Tyrone
High Sheriffs of Longford
British Dominica people
British colonial governors and administrators in Oceania